Jonathan Rufino Jezus Schoop (born October 16, 1991) is a Curaçaoan professional baseball second baseman for the Detroit Tigers of Major League Baseball (MLB). He previously played for the Baltimore Orioles, Milwaukee Brewers, and Minnesota Twins. He was an All-Star in 2017.

Professional career
Before he became a major leaguer, he played in the 2003 and 2004 Little League World Series for Curaçao.
Schoop was signed by the Baltimore Orioles as a free agent in 2008. In 2011, Schoop along with Manny Machado represented the Orioles at the 2011 All-Star Futures Game. He was awarded the Brooks Robinson Minor League Player of the Year, given to the best player in the Orioles minor league system. During his minor league career, Schoop was primarily a shortstop.

Prior to the 2012 season, Schoop was ranked by Baseball America as the Orioles' third-best prospect and the 82nd-best overall.

Baltimore Orioles

2013–2016

Schoop was recalled by the Orioles from the Triple-A Norfolk Tides on September 3, 2013.

In his first major league at-bat on September 25, 2013, Schoop hit a single off Toronto Blue Jays pitcher Esmil Rogers. Two at-bats later, he hit his first career home run off Kyle Drabek, with a distance measured at 430 feet. He finished the game 2-for-3 with a home run, an RBI, a walk, and 3 runs scored. Schoop played in five games at the end of the year and hit .286 (4-for-14), scoring five runs, hitting one home run, and driving in one run.

On April 9, 2014, Schoop hit the second home run of his career off of Yankees RHP Masahiro Tanaka, a towering three-run shot over the left field foul pole at Yankee Stadium helping the Orioles to a 5–4 victory. In 137 games of 2014, Schoop batted .209 with 16 home runs and 45 RBI. With the Orioles finishing 96–66, the team clinched their first regular season AL East championship since 1997. Schoop hit .300 in the Orioles ALDS sweep of the Detroit Tigers, while also driving in two runs. In the ALCS, however, Schoop only hit .091 (1-for-11), as the Orioles were swept by the Kansas City Royals.

On April 11, 2015, Schoop hit his first career grand slam, off of Toronto Blue Jays reliever, Todd Redmond. During a game against the Boston Red Sox on April 17, 2015, Schoop sustained a partially torn PCL and sprained MCL, which forced the Orioles to place him on the disabled list.

Schoop would end up playing in 86 games during the 2015 season, collecting 85 hits (.279), 17 doubles, 15 home runs, 39 RBIs, and two steals in as many attempts. In 387 total chances, Schoop only committed seven errors for a .982 fielding percentage. The Orioles finished the season with an 81–81 record and missed out on the postseason.

2016–2018
Schoop hit .351 while hitting three home runs and driving in eight in the first ten games of 2016. By the end of April, he had hit four home runs, driven in 11, and hit .256. Schoop hit his first grand slam of the season on May 14 in a 9–3 comeback victory over the Tigers. It was Schoop's second home run of the game, and he drove in a total of five runs. On August 14, Schoop hit a go-ahead three-run home run against San Francisco Giants closer Santiago Casilla in the top of the 9th inning to complete a seven-run comeback for the Orioles, having trailed 7–1 prior to the 7th inning. Schoop hit his 20th home run of the season on August 22, his first career 20-homer season. He became the fifth Oriole on the year to have at least 20 home runs, making the Orioles the only Major League club to accomplish this feat on the year. On August 31, Schoop hit his 21st home run of the season, and the 55th of the month for the Orioles, tying an MLB record just two months after setting the home run record in June. Baltimore became the first team to hit 55+ home runs in a month on two occasions. Schoop hit his 25th home run of the season on September 30 against the Yankees, making him the fifth Oriole on the year with at least 25 homers. This tied the franchise record from 1996. They also became just the 12th team in MLB history to do so. It was also the Orioles 250th home run of the season, passing the 2000 Houston Astros for fifth most home runs in a single-season all-time. He finished the 2016 season with 38 doubles, 25 home runs, 82 RBI and batted .267/.298/.454 while starting all 162 regular season games, and the AL Wild Card game against the Toronto Blue Jays.

Through July 2, 2017, Schoop compiled a .297/.352/.545 batting line with 16 homers, 23 doubles, 45 runs scored, 51 RBIs and 1.7 WAR, earning him a trip to the 2017 MLB All-Star Game. In the All-Star Game, Schoop doubled and scored the first run of the game in the fifth inning. Schoop played in 160 games for the Orioles in 2017, compiling a slash line of .293/.338/.503 with 32 homers and 105 runs batted in. He had career-highs in average, on-base, slugging, OPS, OPS+, plate appearances, at-bats, runs scored, hits, home runs and RBI. He placed 12th in the American League MVP voting.

On April 14, 2018, Schoop was placed on the 10-day disabled list due to a right oblique strain. After a disappointing first half that saw him hit just .229 in the first half with ten homers and 25 RBI, Schoop got hot after the All-Star break, tying the MLB record for consecutive games with a home run by a second baseman, with five.

Milwaukee Brewers
On July 31, 2018, Schoop was traded to the Milwaukee Brewers in exchange for Jonathan Villar and minor leaguers Luis Ortiz and Jean Carmona. Schoop struggled to make an offensive impact for the Brewers, contributing a stat line of .202/.246/.331 during the remainder of the regular season. Schoop also failed to get a hit in any of his eight postseason at-bats with the Brewers.

Minnesota Twins
On December 6, 2018, Schoop signed a one-year, $7.5 million contract with the Minnesota Twins.

Schoop hit his 20th and 21st home runs of the 2019 season on August 28, 2019.  In doing so, he became the 7th Twins player to hit 20 or more home runs in the same season, tying a record that has only been accomplished 8 times in MLB history.

On defense, in 2019 he had the lowest fielding percentage of all major league second basemen (.968).

Detroit Tigers

On December 21, 2019, Schoop signed a one-year, $6.1 million contract with the Detroit Tigers.

On July 24, 2020, Schoop made his Tigers debut as the Opening Day starting second baseman. He remained the everyday second baseman until he got hit on the wrist and ended up on the 10-day injured list on September 13. Schoop was moved to the 45-day IL the following week, ending his 2020 season. In 44 games during the 2020 season, Schoop hit .278 with 8 home runs and 23 RBI.

On February 5, 2021, Schoop re-signed with the Tigers on a one-year, $4.5 million contract. During the 2021 season, Schoop played more games at first base (114) than his natural second base position (38). This was due to the struggles and subsequent demotion of Renato Núñez, as well as Miguel Cabrera being frequently used as a designated hitter.

On August 7th, 2021, Schoop signed a two-year, $15 million contract extension with the Detroit Tigers, with a clause allowing a mutual opt-out after the 2022 season. For the 2021 season, Schoop hit .278 with 22 home runs and a team-leading 84 RBI.  He also finished top 10 in games played by position players in the MLB, with 156.

Schoop returned to playing mostly at second base in the 2022 season. On May 30, 2022, Schoop had a three-hit game against the Minnesota Twins that included his 1,000th career hit, a double off starter Dylan Bundy. Schoop is one of three players from Curaçao to reach 1,000 major league hits, joining Andruw Jones and Andrelton Simmons.

In 2022 he batted .202(the lowest batting average in the AL of all qualified batters)/.239(the lowest OBP in the majors)/.322. His .561 OPS was the lowest in the majors. He had the highest percentage of softly hit balls of all major leaguers (24.1%).

International career
Schoop played for the Netherlands national baseball team at the 2011 Baseball World Cup, 2012 European Baseball Championship, 2013 World Baseball Classic and 2017 World Baseball Classic.

Personal life
Schoop competed in the Little League World Series twice on the Pabao Little League team from Willemstad. His brother, Sharlon Schoop, is also a professional baseball player.

References

External links

1991 births
Living people
Aberdeen IronBirds players
American League All-Stars
Baltimore Orioles players
Bluefield Orioles players
Bowie Baysox players
Curaçao expatriate baseball players in the United States
Delmarva Shorebirds players
Detroit Tigers players
Dominican Summer League Orioles players
Curaçao expatriate baseball players in the Dominican Republic
Dutch people of Curaçao descent
Frederick Keys players
Gulf Coast Orioles players
Major League Baseball second basemen
Major League Baseball players from Curaçao
Mesa Solar Sox players
Milwaukee Brewers players
Minnesota Twins players
National baseball team players
Norfolk Tides players
People from Willemstad
Surprise Saguaros players
2013 World Baseball Classic players
2017 World Baseball Classic players
2023 World Baseball Classic players